

Tintern Abbey was a Cistercian abbey located on the Hook Peninsula, County Wexford, Ireland.

The Abbey – which is today in ruins, some of which have been restored – was founded in c.1200 by William Marshal, Earl of Pembroke, as the result of a vow he had made when his boat was caught in a storm nearby. While the specific date of foundation is unconfirmed in some sources, in a 1917 analysis for the Royal Irish Academy, church historian J. H. Bernard suggests a foundation date of 3 December 1200.

Once established, the abbey was colonised by monks from the Cistercian abbey at Tintern in Monmouthshire, Wales, of which Marshal was also patron. To distinguish the two, the mother house in Wales was sometimes known as "Tintern Major" and the abbey in Ireland as "Tintern de Voto" (Tintern of the vow).

After the Dissolution of the Monasteries the abbey and its grounds were granted firstly to  Sir James Croft, and then in 1575 to  Anthony Colclough of Staffordshire, a soldier of Henry VIII. His descendants became the Colclough Baronets. The final member of the Colclough family to reside at Tintern was Lucey Marie Biddulph Colclough who donated the abbey to the Irish state. 

Between 1982 and 2007, the National Monuments service of the Office of Public Works undertook a number of excavation and heritage development efforts at the abbey, including special conservation measures for local bat colonies. Additional works were undertaken after a fire in the site's visitor centre in 2012, which damaged part of the 19th century outbuildings on the abbey's grounds.

Gallery

See also
 List of abbeys and priories in Ireland (County Wexford)

References

External links

Buildings and structures in County Wexford
Cistercian monasteries in the Republic of Ireland
Ruins in the Republic of Ireland
Tourist attractions in County Wexford
Religion in County Wexford
Christian monasteries established in the 13th century
National Monuments in County Wexford